The Exclusive Economic Zone of Croatia (IGP) is a protected fishing area over Croatian half of Adriatic sea.

The EEZ was firstly proclaimed as Ecological and Fisheries Protection Zone (ZERP) and initiated by the Croatian Peasant Party, then a member of Croatia's governing coalition. The Government of Ivica Račan proposed it to the Croatian Parliament, which voted in favour on 3 October 2003. It came into effect exactly one year later, excluding European Union member states. The government informed the United Nations Secretariat of the decision prior to the 2004 enactment of the zone. On 1 January 2008, the zone came into full effect as it began to be enforced for EU nations.

The zone has an area of 23,870 square kilometres. The exact boundaries of the zone date back to treaties between what was then SFR Yugoslavia and Italy in 1968 and between Croatia and FR Yugoslavia in 2001. Prior to the ZERP's declaration, Italian ships annually caught 300 million euros worth of fish from the zone - ten times the amount which Croatian ships caught. In its enactment of the zone, the Croatian Government also cited the danger of the Prestige oil spill being repeated on the Croatian Adriatic, which would seriously affect the country's tourism industry.

The zone has widespread support in Croatia. All major political parties support the zone, including the Social Democratic Party, Croatian Peasant Party, and Democratic Centre. The Croatian Democratic Union has been a cautious supporter, wary of the EU's response.

In 2008, Luigi Giannini, leader of Italian fishermen's organisation Federcoopesca, declared that one-third of all Italian fishing activity took place in the ZERP.

On 10 March 2008, the HDZ-led government decided not to enforce ZERP for EU members from 15 March 2008 onwards.

In 2011, during negotiations with the European Union, it was decided that Croatia could proclaim an ecological protection zone for third countries, but not for EU member states. Slovenian fishermen catch about 40% of their fish in the zone.

On February 5, 2021, the Croatian Parliament unanimously declared EEZ after consultations with Italy and Slovenia, after it became known that Italy was planning to declare EEZ on its part Adriatic sea.

Enforcement
On 3 January 2008, the Croatian Navy intercepted an Italian boat which had passed through the zone and was in Croatian territorial waters. The fishing boat was escorted to Vis by a navy warship and the three fishermen were arrested.

On 6 February 2008, the Turkish cargo ship UND Adriyatik caught fire just outside the zone. According to Croatian media, it was seen as a test for the ZERP.

On 26 May 2021, the maritime police from Split intercepted an Italian fisherman with two Italians onboard. They were charged of illegally crossing the border and fishing without privileges within the territorial sea of the Republic of Croatia. At the fishing boat, the police officers found and seized six caches with 20.4 kilograms of various types of fish.

See also
 Exclusive economic zone of Italy

References

External links 
 Decision on the Extension of the Jurisdiction of the Republic of Croatia in the Adriatic Sea, 3 October 2003

Nature conservation in Croatia
Exclusive economic zones
Fisheries protection
Fishing in Europe
Croatia–Slovenia relations
Croatia–Italy relations
Protected areas of Croatia